Rivinilda Correia Mentai (born 1 April 1994) is a Portuguese sprinter who specializes in the 400 metres.

She competed at the 2012 World Junior Championships, the 2015 European U23 Championships (200 m) and the 2018 Mediterranean Games without reaching the final.

Mentai has also won a national 200 m title in 2015 and national indoor titles in 2016, 2017 and 2018.

In the 4 × 400 metres relay she won a gold medal at the 2018 Ibero-American Championships and finished fifth at the 2018 Mediterranean Games. She also competed at the 2015 European U23 Championships (4 × 100 m relay), the 2016 European Championships, the 2018 World Indoor Championships and the 2018 European Championships without reaching the final. At the 2018 World Indoor Championships the team did however set a new Portuguese indoor record of 3:35.43 minutes.

Her personal best time is 53.65 seconds, achieved in May 2018 in Lisboa.

References

1994 births
Living people
Portuguese female sprinters
Athletes (track and field) at the 2019 European Games
European Games medalists in athletics
European Games bronze medalists for Portugal
Athletes (track and field) at the 2018 Mediterranean Games
Ibero-American Championships in Athletics winners
Mediterranean Games competitors for Portugal